Robyn Hilton is an American film and television actress and model. Hilton was active in the 1970s and 1980s following her debut supporting role as Miss Stein, the secretary to Governor William J. Le Petomane, in Mel Brooks' 1974 comedy film Blazing Saddles.

Life and career
Hilton grew up on a farm near Twin Falls, Idaho. She graduated from Jerome High School in 1958. Hilton attended Boise Junior College and Utah State University before becoming a weather forecaster in her home town.

In addition to other film and television work, Hilton appeared as a guest on The Tonight Show Starring Johnny Carson on January 17, 1974. Her last credited role was in 1985.

Filmography
 Blazing Saddles (1974) as Miss Stein
 The Single Girls (1974) as Denise
 The Last Porno Flick (1974) as Linda Loveman
 The Rookies episode (1974) as Crystal
 Police Woman episode "Shoefly" (1974) as Trudy
 Doc Savage: The Man of Bronze (1975) as Karen
 Video Vixens (1975) Inga
 Starsky and Hutch episode "Huggy Bear and the Turkey" (1977) as Miss O'Toole
 Malibu Express (1985) as Maid Marian

Notes

References

External links
 
 Robyn Hilton at the British Film Institute

Living people
20th-century American actresses
American film actresses
American television actresses
Female models from Idaho
People from Twin Falls, Idaho
21st-century American women
1941 births